GameShark is the brand name of a line of video game cheat cartridges and other products for a variety of console video game systems and Windows-based computers. Currently, the brand name is owned by Mad Catz, which marketed GameShark products for the Sony PlayStation, Xbox, and Nintendo game consoles. Players load cheat codes from GameShark discs or cartridges onto the console's internal or external memory, so that when the game is loaded, the selected cheats can be applied.

Products
When the original GameShark was released, it came with 4,000 preloaded codes. Codes could be entered, but unlike the Game Genie, codes were saved in the onboard flash memory and could be accessed later rather than having to be reentered. The cartridges also acted as memory cards, with equal or greater storage capacity to the consoles' first party memory cards. It was originally released for the Sega Saturn and Sony PlayStation consoles in January 1996. It was a runner-up for Electronic Gaming Monthlys Best Peripheral of 1996 (behind the Saturn analog controller). A GameShark was released for the Nintendo 64 in late August 1997. The Nintendo 64 GameShark also bypasses the console's regional lockout, allowing games from any region to be played on the same unit.

See also
 Action Replay
 Code Breaker
 DexDrive
 Game Genie
 Multiface
 MaxDrive
 SharkWire Online
 Xploder
 Equalizer (Datel)

References

External links

 GameShark.com
 GSCentral.com
The GSHI

Computer peripherals
Unlicensed Nintendo hardware
Cheating in video games
Computer-related introductions in 1995